Lost Town Creek is a stream in the U.S. state of Georgia. It is a tributary to Shoal Creek.

Lost Town Creek most likely is the English translation of its original Cherokee name.

References

Rivers of Georgia (U.S. state)
Rivers of Cherokee County, Georgia